The Men's 200m individual medley event at the 2010 South American Games was held on March 28, with the heats at 11:06 and the Final at 18:20.

Medalists

Records

Results

Heats

Final

References
Heats
Final

Medley 200m M